The William Parker Caldwell House in the community of Gardner in Weakley County, Tennessee, was the home of William Parker Caldwell, a local lawyer and politician who was Gardner's first mayor and who served in the U.S. House of Representatives and both houses of the Tennessee General Assembly. The historic home was listed on the National Register of Historic Places in 1979.

References

Houses on the National Register of Historic Places in Tennessee
Houses completed in 1860
Houses in Weakley County, Tennessee
National Register of Historic Places in Weakley County, Tennessee
1860 establishments in Tennessee